Rhododendron nakaharae (那克哈杜鹃) is a rhododendron species native to northern Taiwan, where it grows at altitudes of . The flowers are red.

References
 "Rhododendron nakaharae", Hayata, J. Coll. Sci. Imp. Univ. Tokyo. 25(19): 153. 1908.

nakaharae